Rebecca O'Mara (born 15 March 1977) is an Irish actress. The Dublin born actress grew up by the sea in Sandycove and is the voice actor for Caitlin in the children's television series Thomas & Friends.

Early life
O'Mara attended Holy Child Killiney before completing a degree in Drama and Theatre at Trinity College Dublin. On graduating, she moved to London and worked in film production for some years. In 2004, she began her acting training at the London Academy of Music and Dramatic Art (LAMDA).

Career
She has also worked extensively in theatre in the UK and Ireland since graduating from the London Academy of Music and Dramatic Art (LAMDA). She played Minnie Larkins in The History of Mr Polly,  Mrs. O Keefe in the 2014 Ken Loach film Jimmy's Hall and has guest starred in various television programmes including Line of Duty and Doctors, but is probably best known for her role as scene of crime officer, Frankie Hynes, in TV3's Red Rock. In 2018, at the Mick Lally Theatre in Galway, she starred in Druid Theatre's production of Furniture, a "wickedly insightful comedy" from Sonya Kelly. In March 2019, she won the Irish Times Theatre Award for Best Actress in a Supporting Role for the performance.

Personal life
She is married to Irish composer Ciaran Hope and is the younger sister of actor, Jason O'Mara.

Filmography

Television

Film

Theatre

Awards and nominations

References

External links 
 
 My cultural life: Rebecca O'Mara [The Sunday Independent 2017-05-01]
 Get To Know Irish Actress Rebecca O’Mara [The Gloss Magazine 2017-07-17]
 Something For The Weekend: Rebecca O'Mara's Cultural Picks [RTE Culture 2017-05-15]
 Back on the rails [The Sunday Times 2017-02-26]

1977 births
Living people
Irish stage actresses
Irish voice actresses
Irish film actresses
Irish television actresses
People educated at Holy Child Killiney
People from Sandycove